Barbara is a British sitcom starring Gwen Taylor in the title role. A pilot was broadcast in 1995 by Central Television, and three series were then televised on ITV from 1999 to 2003 by Carlton Television. It was filmed at Carlton Studios in Nottingham in front of a live studio audience. The majority of location scenes for the series were filmed in various suburbs of Nottingham, including Mapperley and West Bridgford, with other scenes filmed around Nottinghamshire and Derbyshire.

Plot
Barbara Liversidge is a no-nonsense, outspoken, nosey, middle-aged doctor's receptionist with a sharp tongue. She has been married to her husband Ted, a mild-mannered taxi driver, for 40 years. Barbara is by far the dominant figure in the relationship, but Ted does occasionally stand up to her. The pair live in Pudsey, Leeds, West Yorkshire with their twenty-something son Neil, who drifts between jobs and a succession of short-term relationships. Their daughter, the long-suffering Linda, is married to Martin Pond, a TV presenter who has his own slot on the local news, Pond Life, which generally involves him making a fool of himself. Jean is Barbara's appearance-obsessed sister (Barbara once claims she's had so much plastic surgery that "she literally doesn't know her arse from her elbow") who marries the simpering Phil. Barbara's colleague at the doctor's surgery, Doreen, often regales Barbara with tales of the bizarre situations she and her never-seen husband Clive find themselves in.

Much of the humour revolves around Barbara's tactlessness and her family's fear of getting on the wrong side of her. While the family often complain about her, they usually find they struggle to manage when Barbara doesn't take charge. Although the show initially appears to have a very traditional sitcom setting, surreal humour is frequently used, such as Barbara baking a cake that looks like Judi Dench and a taxidermist friend of Ted's stuffing and mounting his dead wife. There were also some more drama-based plots, such as Linda's discovery she can't have any more children after the birth of her son George. In a particularly dark development, the final episode ("Who Shot Barbara?") ends with an unseen assailant shooting Barbara from behind - a cliffhanger which is never resolved.

Cast

Pilot
Gwen Taylor - Barbara Liversage
Sam Kelly - Ted Liversage
Shirley Anne Field - Jean
Caroline Milmoe - Linda Benson
Glen Davies - Martin Benson
Madge Hindle - Doreen
Ben Robinson - Baby

Series
Gwen Taylor - Barbara Liversidge
Sam Kelly - Ted Liversidge
Benedict Sandiford - Neil Liversidge
Sherrie Hewson - Jean Nesbitt
Elizabeth Carling - Linda Pond
Mark Benton - Martin Pond
Madge Hindle - Doreen
John Arthur - Phil
Jean Alexander - Queenie Liversidge

Series Overview

Pilot: 10 July 1995 (1 Episode)
Series 1: 27 June 1999 to 1 August 1999 (6 Episodes)
Series 2: 24 November 2000 to 24 June 2001 (10 Episodes)
Series 3: 23 April 2002 to 4 April 2003 (12 Episodes)

Episodes

Pilot (1995)
"Job" (10 July 1995)

Series 1 (1999)
All Sunday, 8 pm, ITV except Scattering, shown at 7 pm
"Birthday" (27 June 1999) Ratings: 9.8m
"Rivals" (4 July 1999) Ratings 8.21m
"Amour" (11 July 1999) Ratings: 7.44m
"Friends" (18 July 1999) Ratings: 6.4m
"Coffee" (25 July 1999) Ratings: 7.18m
"Scattering" (1 August 1999) Ratings: 5.02m

Series 2 (2000-01)
"Kids" (24 November 2000) Ratings: 7.55m
"Massage" (1 December 2000) Ratings: N/A
"Mum" (8 December 2000) Ratings: 8.70m
"Christening" (15 December 2000) Ratings: 7.56m
"Tyres" (22 December 2000) Ratings: 6.89m
"Fox" (24 December 2000) Ratings: 7.59m
"Sisters" (23 March 2001) Ratings: 5.80m
"Mate" (30 March 2001) Ratings: N/A
"Wedding" (6 April 2001) Ratings: 5.97m
"Sheep" (24 June 2001) Ratings: N/A

Series 3 (2002-03)
The twelve episodes making up Series Three were recorded as a complete series in 2001, but were split into two separate series upon broadcast - six airing in 2002 and the remaining six airing in 2003. The 2002 episodes were shown Tuesdays at 8.30 pm, apart from "Flood" which was shown at 8.00 pm and "Valentine" which was shown on a Saturday at 7.45 pm. All 2003 episodes were shown Sundays at 7.00 pm; with the exception of the last 2 episodes on Fridays at 8.30 pm due to the ITV News coverage of the Iraq war. The Series Three DVD release contains the full twelve episodes.
"Queenie" (23 April 2002) Ratings: 6.97m
"Flood" (7 May 2002) Ratings: 5.4m
"Valentine" (11 May 2002) Ratings: 4.8m
"Crime" (14 May 2002) Ratings: 6.74m
"Weekend" (21 May 2002) Ratings: 4.7m
"Baby" (28 May 2002) Ratings: 4.97m
"Honeymoon" (23 February 2003) Ratings: 5.34m
"Neighbours" (2 March 2003) Ratings: 5.42m
"Guy Fawkes" (9 March 2003) Ratings: 5.94m
"Kirsty" (16 March 2003) Ratings: 5.02m
"Cottage" (28 March 2003)
"Who Shot Barbara?" (4 April 2003)

Filming locations 
The majority of location scenes for the series were filmed in various suburbs of Nottingham, including Mapperley and West Bridgford. The exterior location for the Liversidge house is located on Sandford Road in Mapperley, whilst the exterior used for Barbara's workplace is the West Oak Surgery on nearby Westdale Lane.

Martin's news studio is the exterior of Carlton's Lenton Lane studios.

Release
Barbara was first shown as a pilot within the Comedy Firsts series on 10 July 1995. Four years later, on 27 June 1999 the first of three series was presented, with some of the cast and names of the characters being changed from when the programme first appeared. Unusually for an English sitcom, Barbara was written by a team of writers; Mark Bussell, Rob Clark, Ramsay Gilderdale, Graham Mark Walker and Justin Sbresni.

Reception 
Initial reactions to the pilot were lukewarm. While The Guardian described Taylor as 'ever-watchable', it felt there was too much focus on character at the expense of plot, summing up 'whether or not there's a series in here remains to be seen'. Critics remained ambivalent as Barbara progressed to full series; previewing the second series opener in The Guardian, Jonathan Wright felt the show had become 'an enjoyable slice of mainstream sitcom', but Charlie Catchpole in The Mirror felt Taylor and Kelly were both 'sadly wasted', remarking 'Carlton Television say Barbara is ITV's most popular comedy for five years. I believe them. It's not exactly a crowded field, is it?'. However, every episode of the 1999 and 2002 series was in ITV's top 30 weekly ratings as compiled by BARB and audience figures frequently averaged around 5-7 million viewers, 17 of the episodes winning their slots, meaning they were the most watched shows at the time of broadcast.

The Independent Television Commission's annual report for 2001 labelled Barbara 'a rare exception' to the otherwise unimpressive 'commitment to comedy shown by ITV', as represented by shows such as Sam's Game and Babes in the Wood.

DVD releases

References

External links

Barbara at British TV Comedy

1995 British television series debuts
2003 British television series endings
1990s British sitcoms
2000s British sitcoms
English-language television shows
ITV sitcoms
Carlton Television
Television shows filmed in Nottinghamshire
Television shows set in Leeds
Television series by ITV Studios
Television shows produced by Central Independent Television